The United Christian Church of Dubai (UCCD) is an evangelical church. It was First established in 1962 as a fellowship of expatriate workers in the Emirate, 1,000 people from over 50 nationalities attended the weekly services.

History

1970–1990
In 1977, as more expatriate Christians came to Dubai, the small fellowship constituted itself as a church, called the International Evangelical Church of Dubai. A pastor was called, and a statement of doctrine was adopted.  In the following year, the first constitution was accepted. The church was then meeting on Sundays in the Jumeirah American School (now the American School of Dubai), and Sunday School were held there in the afternoons.

Due to international tensions in the 1980s, the church was asked to leave the Jumierah American School for security reasons. For a while, the church met in hired hotel rooms and later in an English School and The Cambridge High School, by arrangement with the school’s owner, Mrs Varkey.

1990–2000
In 1990, the church leased a large Arabic style villa in Jumeirah (the “Jumeirah Villa”), which remained the church home until September 2003, and continued thereafter to be used for Sunday evening services and other churches’ meetings until the Dubai Municipality ordered the villa’s closure in June 2006.

With the Villa as a permanent place of worship, the church grew significantly.  Most notably, in 1990, a Friday morning service was started by 4 families which grew to become the main gathering of the church.   The Villa was also used by other Christian groups, including the Arabic Evangelical Church of Dubai (AECD).  In 1994, an informal group composed of UCCD, AECD, and others applied for a grant of land from the Ruler of Dubai on which to construct a church building. The Ruler of Dubai in 1998 granted a piece of land to these churches, and fundraising commenced for a building.

2000–present
In September of 2003, the Friday services commenced at the new Dubai Evangelical Church Centre (“DECC”) in Maranatha Hall at the Churches Complex in Jebel Ali Village. By 2009, six years after DECC was constructed, the total cost of construction had been covered (primarily by members of UCCD) and all loans repaid. It is located within a compound alongside church buildings of other denominations.

In 2010, UCCD sent out a number of members and staff to establish a sister church, Redeemer Church of Dubai, on the opposite side of Dubai. UCCD continued to support Redeemer Church of Dubai financially until 2012, by which time it had grown into a self-supporting church.

Although licences to hold Christian worship or build churches in Dubai are restricted, UCCD's pastor joined other Christian leaders in 2011 to express their gratitude to the Government for their freedom to meet.

See also
 Churches Complex
 Christianity in the United Arab Emirates
 Religion in the United Arab Emirates

References

Churches in Dubai
Evangelical churches in the United Arab Emirates
Christian organizations established in 1962
Evangelical denominations in Asia
Religion in Dubai